Kwielice  is a village in the administrative district of Gmina Grębocice, within Polkowice County, Lower Silesian Voivodeship, in south-western Poland.

Until 1945 it was as Quilitz a part of Germany.

References

Kwielice